The Canterbury Earthquake National Memorial is the Crown's official memorial for those killed or seriously injured in the 22 February 2011 Christchurch earthquake. It is located on both sides of the Avon River downstream from the Montreal Street bridge. The memorial opened on 22 February 2017, the sixth anniversary of the earthquake.

Project development

The memorial was one of the projects identified in the Christchurch Central Recovery Plan, commonly referred to as the Blueprint, released on 30 July 2012 by the Canterbury Earthquake Recovery Authority (CERA). The Blueprint gave the first quarter of 2016 as the project finish date in its indicative time line. The project was led by the Ministry for Culture and Heritage, with project partners CERA, Christchurch City Council, and Te Rūnanga o Ngāi Tahu. The purpose of the memorial is described as follows in the Blueprint:

At the time the Blueprint was released, an informal earthquake memorial, 185 empty chairs,  had already been created by local artist Peter Majendie. However, it was expected that it was to be an installation for the short term only.

Site for the memorial
The site for the official memorial, both sides of the Avon River downstream from where Montreal Street crosses the river, was revealed in July 2014 as part of the design brief. The following site description was given as part of the brief:

Design competition

The objectives for the memorial were for a design that:
 Honours the 185 people who lost their lives, as well as those who were injured in the Canterbury earthquakes
 Remembers and gives thanks to the many organisations from around the country and around the world that assisted in the rescue and recovery
 Recognises the shared human experiences of those involved in the events, and the effects of the earthquakes on the city and Canterbury including the loss of many treasured heritage buildings, as well as the familiar everyday cityscape
 Provides a space for hosting formal civic events, such as an annual memorial gathering on 22 February
 Allows for reflection and contemplation on a day-to-day basis, including for small groups or individuals
 Becomes the anchor point for remembering in the city and Canterbury and part of the wider context of the impact of the earthquakes

Parties interested in the competition had to register with the Christchurch Central Development Unit (CCDU) to obtain a registration number, which had to be shown on all submitted material as an identifier. Company logos or other branding were not allowed, ensuring that the evaluation panel would not be biased.  The invitation to submit designs drew 330 responses from 37 countries. Of these, six were short-listed and in October 2014, people injured and families of those who died were asked for feedback. On 10 December 2014, CERA informed the public via a press release that six designs had been short-listed and that the finalists had been asked to further develop their designs. At that time, the intention of having the memorial finished in 2016 was reiterated. A week later, the designs were leaked to The Press, with the local newspaper publishing the preliminary design plans on 18 December 2014. The official release of the short-list with finalised plans happened on 17 February 2015, just before the fourth anniversary of the earthquake, when Nicky Wagner in her role as Associate Earthquake Recovery Minister presented them to the public. At the release, Wagner expressed the hope that the memorial "would be at least partially built" by the 2016 anniversary, indicating that the original time line would not be met.

Construction
As part of the work, part of Oxford Terrace will be turned into a pedestrian precinct; prior to the earthquake, it was part of the central city's one-way system. Construction of the memorial started with a groundbreaking ceremony by the Prime Minister – John Key, Earthquake Recovery Minister – Gerry Brownlee, Mayor of Christchurch – Lianne Dalziel, and Ngāi Tahu chairperson – Mark Solomon, on 12 November 2015. During rain in May 2016, the construction site flooded and a spokesman stated: "It will flood occasionally and it is designed to cope with this."

The memorial was opened on 22 February 2017. The costs of the memorial were reported to be NZ$11m, with $10m from the government, and $1m from the Christchurch Earthquake Mayoral Relief Fund.

Footnotes

Notes

References

Monuments and memorials in New Zealand
Christchurch Central City
Buildings and structures in Christchurch
Cultural infrastructure completed in 2017
Tourist attractions in Christchurch
2011 Christchurch earthquake
2017 establishments in New Zealand
Outdoor sculptures in Christchurch